The 1971 Major League Baseball season was the final season for the Senators in Washington, D.C., before the team's relocation to the Dallas-Fort Worth suburb Arlington for the following season, as the Texas Rangers, leaving the nation's capital without a baseball team of its own until 2005.

This was the final season the majority of MLB teams wore wool flannel uniforms. The Pirates and Cardinals wore double knit uniforms of nylon and rayon throughout 1971, and the Orioles gradually phased out flannels, going all-double knit in time for the ALCS. By 1973, flannel uniforms completely disappeared from the MLB scene.

Standings

American League

National League

Postseason

Bracket

Awards and honors
Baseball Hall of Fame
Dave Bancroft
Jake Beckley
Chick Hafey
Harry Hooper
Joe Kelley
Rube Marquard
Satchel Paige
George Weiss
Most Valuable Player
Vida Blue, Oakland Athletics (AL)
Joe Torre, St. Louis Cardinals (NL)
Cy Young Award
Vida Blue, Oakland Athletics (AL)
Ferguson Jenkins, Chicago Cubs (NL)
Rookie of the Year
Chris Chambliss, Cleveland Indians (AL)
Earl Williams, Atlanta Braves (NL)
Gold Glove Award
George Scott (1B) (AL) 
Davey Johnson (2B) (AL) 
Brooks Robinson (3B) (AL) 
Mark Belanger (SS) (AL) 
Paul Blair (OF) (AL) 
Amos Otis (OF) (AL) 
Carl Yastrzemski (OF) (AL)
Ray Fosse (C) (AL) 
Jim Kaat (P) (AL)

Statistical leaders

Regular Season Recap
Three of the four division races were anticlimactic; the only race was in the N.L. West between old rivals Los Angeles Dodgers and San Francisco Giants. The Giants led by 8.5 games on September 1 but the Dodgers chipped away. In mid September, the Dodgers won 8 in a row, including 5 over the Giants to narrow the gap to one game. But they could get no closer; ultimately both teams won on the final day of the season and the Giants won the division by 1 game.

Home Field Attendance

Events

January–June
The Pittsburgh Pirates become the first Major League Baseball team to field an all-black lineup.
January 31 – The new Special Veterans Committee selects seven men for enshrinement to the Hall of Fame: former players Dave Bancroft, Jake Beckley, Chick Hafey, Harry Hooper, Joe Kelley, and Rube Marquard, and executive George Weiss.
February 9 – Former Negro leagues pitcher Satchel Paige is nominated for the Hall of Fame. On June 10, the Hall's new Veterans Committee formally selected Paige for induction.
March 7 - The Milwaukee Brewers and Oakland Athletics play a spring training game where only three balls are needed for a walk. The Athletics won 13-9, with the game featuring 19 walks. The experiment is not tried again.
April 6 – Bill White, a former NL first baseman, became the first African-American to do play-by-play as part of a regular broadcast crew of a team, when the New York Yankees opened the season with a game in Boston.
April 10 – The Philadelphia Phillies defeat the Montreal Expos, 4–1, in the first game played at Philadelphia's Veterans Stadium.
Willie Stargell hits 3 home runs for the Pittsburgh Pirates in a game, including his 200th career home run.
April 27 – Hank Aaron becomes the third player in Major League history to hit his 600th home run.
May 6 – Commissioner Bowie Kuhn signs Major League Baseball to a $72 million television contract with NBC.
May 17 – Johnny Bench hits his 100th career home run.
June 3 – Pitcher Ken Holtzman of the Chicago Cubs throws the second no-hitter of his career, victimizing the hosts Cincinnati Reds 1–0. Holtzman scores the only run, unearned, in the third inning, to beat Reds pitcher Gary Nolan.
June 6 – Willie Mays hits his major league-leading 22nd and last career extra-inning home run against Phillies reliever Joe Hoerner.
June 23 – In a singular performance, pitcher Rick Wise of the Philadelphia Phillies no-hits the Reds, 4–0, and bangs two home runs in the game. Wise joins Earl Wilson and Wes Ferrell as the only pitchers to pitch a no-hitter and hit a home run in the same game. It is the second no-hitter against Cincinnati this month, both in Riverfront Stadium.

July–December
July 7 – Commissioner Kuhn announces that players from the Negro leagues elected to the Hall of Fame will be given full membership in the museum. It had been previously announced that they would be honored in a separate wing.
July 9 – The Oakland Athletics beat the California Angels 1–0 in 20 innings – the longest shutout in American League history. Vida Blue strikes out 17 batters in 11 innings for Oakland, while the Angels' Billy Cowan ties a major league record by fanning six times. Both teams combine for 43 strikeouts, a new major league record.
July 13 – In an All-Star Game featuring home runs by future Hall of Famers Hank Aaron, Johnny Bench, Roberto Clemente, Reggie Jackson, Harmon Killebrew and Frank Robinson, the American League triumphs over the National League 6–4 at Tiger Stadium. It is the only AL All-Star victory between 1962 and 1983. Jackson's home run goes 520 feet, and Robinson is named MVP.
August 4 – St. Louis Cardinals pitcher Bob Gibson wins his 200th game, a 7–2 victory over the San Francisco Giants at St. Louis.
August 10:
Harmon Killebrew becomes the 10th player to amass 500 home runs, and adds his 501st, but the Orioles beat the Twins 4–3. Mike Cuellar picks up the win.
Sixteen baseball researchers at Cooperstown form the Society for American Baseball Research (SABR), with founder Robert Davids as president.
August 14 – Ten days after his 200th victory, St. Louis Cardinal pitcher Bob Gibson no-hits the Pittsburgh Pirates 11–0, the first no-hitter ever pitched at Three Rivers Stadium. He strikes out 10 batters along the way; three of those are to Willie Stargell, including the final out. The no-hitter is the first to be pitched in Pittsburgh in 64 years; none had been pitched in the 62-year (mid-1909 to mid-1970) history of Three Rivers Stadium's predecessor, Forbes Field.
August 28 – Phillies pitcher Rick Wise hits two home runs, including a grand slam off Don McMahon, in the second game of a doubleheader, duplicating his feat in his June no-hitter. Wise beats the Giants 7–3.
September 1 – The Pittsburgh Pirates start what is believed to be the first All-Black lineup in major league history, which include several Latin American players, in a 10–7 victory over the Phillies. The lineup: Rennie Stennett (2B); Gene Clines (CF); Roberto Clemente (RF); Willie Stargell (LF); Manny Sanguillén (C); Dave Cash (3B); Al Oliver (1B); Jackie Hernández (SS), and Dock Ellis (P). Another black player, Bob Veale, was one of three relievers in the game.
September 5 – J. R. Richard tied Karl Spooner's major league record by striking out 15 San Francisco Giants in his first major league game, as the Houston Astros beat the Giants.
September 13 – Baltimore Orioles first baseman Frank Robinson becomes the 11th player to reach 500 career home runs.
September 26 – Baltimore Orioles pitcher Jim Palmer shuts out the host Cleveland Indians 5–0, and becomes the fourth member of the Orioles 1971 pitching staff to notch his 20th victory, joining Dave McNally, Mike Cuellar and Pat Dobson. Only one other team in ML history, the 1920 Chicago White Sox, boasted four 20-game winners.
September 30 – The Washington Senators' lead 7–5 in their last home game, but forfeit the game to the New York Yankees, when, with two outs in the top of the ninth, fans storm the field. The Senators moved to Dallas, Texas, and became the Texas Rangers for the 1972 season, leaving the Nation's Capital without an MLB team until 2005.
October 17 – Pitcher Steve Blass throws a four-hitter and Roberto Clemente homers as the Pittsburgh Pirates win Game Seven of the World Series over the Baltimore Orioles, 2–1, becoming World Champions for the first time since 1960. Clemente is named the Series MVP. Game Four of this World Series was the first night game played in Series history.
November 2 – The Orioles' Pat Dobson pitches a no-hitter against the Yomiuri Giants, winning 2–0. It is the first no-hitter in Japanese-American baseball exhibition history. The Orioles compile a record of 12–2–4 on the tour.
December 1 – The Chicago Cubs release Ernie Banks and promptly rehire him as a coach.
December 10 – The California Angels send star shortstop Jim Fregosi to the New York Mets in return for four players, one of whom is Nolan Ryan.

References

External links
1971 Major League Baseball season schedule at Baseball Reference

 
Major League Baseball seasons